Haleyuru  is a village in the southern state of Karnataka, India. It is located in the Krishnarajanagara taluk of Mysore district.

Demographics
 India census, Haleyuru had a population of 5581 with 2753 males and 2828 females.

See also
 Mysore
 Districts of Karnataka

References

External links

Villages in Mysore district